Urs Fehlmann (born 25 August 1961) is a Swiss bobsledder who won competed during the 1980s. He won a gold medal in the four-man event at the 1987 FIBT World Championships in St. Moritz. He also competed in the four man event at the 1988 Winter Olympics.

References

External links
Bobsleigh four-man world championship medalists since 1930

Living people
Swiss male bobsledders
1961 births
Olympic bobsledders of Switzerland
Bobsledders at the 1988 Winter Olympics
20th-century Swiss people